Israel García Barreda (born 13 September 1999) is a Mexican professional footballer who plays as a midfielder.

Club career
García began playing football at local club Huracán de Tlapacoyan, and was identified as a regional talent at a young age. He joined the América academy in 2012.

García made his competitive debut with the first team on 14 August 2019, coming on for Andrés Ibargüen during the second half of their 3–2 defeat to Atlanta United in the 2019 Campeones Cup. He then appeared in the Leagues Cup semifinals against Tigres UANL in Houston on August 20, where they lost in penalties. The nineteen-year-old  was subsequently handed his Liga MX debut by manager Miguel "El Piojo" Herrera on 24 August replacing an injured Ibargüen in the early minutes of a 1–1 draw against Tigres UANL.

García signed a two-year extension with América in the summer of 2020, and was subsequently loaned out to Alebrijes de Oaxaca in the second-tier Liga de Expansión MX. He made only six appearances with Oaxaca in the 2020–21 season before returning to América.

Career statistics

Club

Notes

References

External links
 
 

Living people
1999 births
Mexican footballers
Association football midfielders
Club América footballers
Alebrijes de Oaxaca players
Liga MX players
Liga de Expansión MX players
Footballers from Veracruz
People from Martínez de la Torre